The 2018 East Java gubernatorial election took place on 27 June 2018 as part of the simultaneous local elections. It was held to elect the governor of East Java along with their deputy, whilst members of the provincial council (Dewan Perwakilan Rakyat Daerah) will be re-elected in 2019.

Incumbent Soekarwo was barred from participating in the re-elections after having served two full terms. Candidates were former cabinet minister Khofifah Indar Parawansa and sitting vice governor Saifullah Yusuf. The former won the election, securing over 53% of the votes.

Timeline
On September 10, the General Elections Commission declared a voter count of 30,963,078 in the province who are to vote in 68,511 polling stations.

Registration for party-backed candidates were opened between 8 and 10 January 2018, while independent candidates were required to register between 22 and 26 November 2017. The campaigning period would commence between 15 February and 24 June, with a three-day election silence before voting on 27 June.

A televised debate between the two pairs was held on 10 April 2018.

Candidates
Under regulations, candidates are required to secure the support of a political party or a coalition thereof comprising at least 20 seats in the regional house. Alternatively, independent candidates may run provided they are capable of securing support from 6.5 percent of the total voter population (2,012,601) in form of photocopied ID cards subject to verification by the local committee although no candidates expressing interest managed to do this.

The Khofifah–Emil pair was first endorsed by Demokrat on 21 November 2017, and Golkar followed suit on the 22nd. Hanura declared their support on December the same year, while the other parties joined the coalition in January 2018. Khofifah had been the Minister of Social Affairs in Joko Widodo's working cabinet, although she resigned from that post in order to run. Her running mate Emil Dardak is a Japan-educated doctoral graduate who serves as regent of Trenggalek Regency, although he has not resigned from the post. Minister of Home Affairs Tjahjo Kumolo had requested for him to step down for ethical reasons, but he admitted that there are no binding regulations requiring him to do so. The pair have stated that their program will involve women's empowerment, involving the reduction of maternal mortality in addition to skill trainings and economic aid for females.

Saifullah, popularly referred to as Gus Ipul, had served as the vice governor of the province since 2009. PKB, itself having enough seats to run a candidate with no coalition, put him forth as their gubernatorial candidate on 5 October 2017. PDI-P joined the coalition, initially putting forth Banyuwangi regent Abdullah Azwar Anas as running mate until he stepped back following a scandal. The party later appointed Sukarno's granddaughter and two-term member of the People's Representative Council Puti Guntur Sukarnoputri to replace him in the ticket. Despite initially planning to run a ticket alongside PAN, opposition parties Gerindra and PKS declared their support for Ipul-Puti on 10 January 2018. The pair have stated an intention to continue with Soekarwo's programs.

Polling

After formal nominations

Before nominations

Results

Quick count

References

Elections in East Java
2018 Indonesian gubernatorial elections